Surinder Kaur (25 November 1929 – 14 June 2006) was an Indian singer and songwriter. While she mainly sang Punjabi folk songs, where she is credited for pioneering and popularising the genre, Kaur also recorded songs as a playback singer for Hindi films between 1948 and 1952. For her contributions to Punjabi music, she earned the sobriquet Nightingale of Punjab, the Sangeet Natak Akademi Award in 1984, and the Padma Shri in 2006.

In a career spanning nearly six decades, her repertoire included Punjabi Sufi Kafis of Bulleh Shah and verses by contemporary poets like Nand Lal Noorpuri, Amrita Pritam, Mohan Singh and Shiv Kumar Batalvi giving memorable songs like, "Maavan 'te dheean", "Jutti kasuri", "Madhaniyan", "Ehna akhiyan 'ch pavan kiven kajra" and "Ghaman di raat". In time her wedding songs, most notably "Lathe di chadar", "Suhe ve cheere waleya" and "Kaala doria", have become an indelible part of the Punjabi culture.

Early life 
Surinder Kaur was born to a Punjabi Sikh family in Lahore, the capital of the Punjab in British India. She was the sister of Parkash Kaur and Narinder Kaur and the mother of Dolly Guleria, both noted Punjabi singers. She had three daughters of which Dolly is the eldest. She was influenced by Renu Rajan, a prominent figure in Punjabi folk music.

Career 
Surinder Kaur made her professional debut with a live performance on Lahore Radio in August 1943, and the following year on 31 August 1943, she and her elder sister, Parkash Kaur cut their first duet, "maavan 'te dheean ral baithian", for the HMV label, emerging as superstars across the Indian subcontinent.

Following the Partition of India in 1947, Kaur and her parents relocated to Ghaziabad, Delhi. In 1948, she married Professor Joginder Singh Sodhi, a lecturer in Punjabi literature at Delhi University. Recognising her talent, Kaur's husband became her support system, and soon she started a career as a playback singer in Hindi film industry in Bombay, introduced by music director, Ghulam Haider. Under him she sang three songs in the 1948 film Shaheed, including Badnam Na Ho Jaye Mohabbat Ka Fasaana, Aanaa Hai To Aajao and Taqdeer ki aandhi...hum kahaan aur thum kahaan. However, her interest was in stage performances and reviving Punjabi folk songs, and she eventually moved back to Delhi in 1952.

In the decades to follow, she got married, after the 1947 partition of old British Punjab, in 1948. Her husband continued to guide her singing career. "He was the one who made me a star," she later recalled. "He chose all the lyrics I sang and we both collaborated on compositions." Together Kaur and Sodhi arranged for her to sing such Punjabi folk classics as Chan Kithe Guzari Aai Raat, Lathe Di Chadar, Shonkan Mele Di, and Gori Diyan Jhanjran and Sarke-Sarke Jandiye Mutiare. These songs were written by various well-known Punjabi poets but made popular by the singer Surinder Kaur. The couple also served as the public face of the Indian People's Theatre Association (IPTA), an arm of the Indian Communist party in Punjab, spreading messages of peace and love to the most remote villages of East Punjab. She also travelled to many parts of the world performing Punjabi folk songs, gaining rapid popularity.

In all, Kaur recorded more than 2000 songs, including duets with Asa Singh Mastana, Karnail Gill, Harcharan Grewal, Rangila Jatt, and Didar Sandhu.
Although her life and collaboration with Sodhi was cut short upon the educator's death in 1976, she continued the family's creative tradition via duets with their daughter and other disciples. Her daughter, Rupinder Kaur Guleria, better known as Dolly Guleria and granddaughter Sunaini Sharma, culminating in the 1995 LP, 'Surinder Kaur – The Three Generations'.

Awards and recognition
She was conferred the Sangeet Natak Akademi Award for Punjabi Folk Music in 1984, by the Sangeet Natak Academi, India's National Academy of Music, Dance and Theatre, the Millennium Punjabi Singer award, and Padma Shri award in 2006 for her contribution in Arts. The Guru Nanak Dev University conferred on her a doctorate degree in the year 2002.

Illness and death
Towards the later part of her life, wanting to get close to her mitti (her soil), Surinder Kaur settled in Panchkula in 2004, with an aim to construct a house in Zirakpur, near Chandigarh. Subsequently, on 22 December 2005, she suffered a heart attack and was admitted to General Hospital, Panchkula. Later, however, she recovered and personally went to Delhi to receive the coveted Padma Shri Award in January 2006. It is another matter that she was painfully aware of the events that delayed the honour for so long, despite her unparalleled contribution to Punjabi music. But even when she received the award, she was regretful that the nomination for the same had come from Haryana and not Punjab, India for which she worked tirelessly for over five decades.

In 2006, a prolonged illness prompted her to seek treatment in the United States. She died in a New Jersey hospital on 14 June 2006 at the age of 77. She was survived by three daughters, the eldest, singer Dolly Guleria who lives in Panchkula, followed by Nandini Singh and Pramodini Jaggi, both settled in New Jersey. Upon her death, the Prime minister of India, Dr. Manmohan Singh described her as "the nightingale of Punjab", and "a legend in Punjabi folk music and popular music and a trend-setter in Punjabi melody." and added, "I hope that her immortal voice will motivate other artists to practice the right Punjabi folk music tradition".

Legacy
A Doordarshan documentary titled, Punjab Di Koyal (Nightingale of Punjab), on the life and works of Surinder Kaur was released in 2006. It later won  the Doordarshan National Award.

See also
Asa Singh Mastana
Kuldeep Manak
Dolly Guleria
List of Punjabi singers

References

External links
 Surinder Kaur Profile at LastFM, Retrieved 18 Aug 2016
 Download Songs @ FolkPunjab.com, Retrieved 18 Aug 2016

1929 births
2006 deaths
Indian Sikhs
Punjabi people
Singers from Lahore
Indian women folk singers
Indian folk singers
Punjabi-language singers
Indian women playback singers
Bollywood playback singers
Indian women singer-songwriters
Indian singer-songwriters
Recipients of the Padma Shri in arts
Recipients of the Sangeet Natak Akademi Award
Indian People's Theatre Association people
20th-century Indian singers
20th-century Indian women singers
Women musicians from Delhi
Singers from Delhi